Sue Scott is an American actress and character voice actor (AFTRA/SAG/AEA) in Minneapolis and St. Paul, Minnesota. She is best known for her work as a radio comedy actor on Garrison Keillor's public radio show, A Prairie Home Companion, and for her work as a voice-over talent in radio and television commercials. She has also appeared in films and television.

She has appeared in productions at the Great American History Theatre, Nautilus Music-Theater, Mixed Blood Theatre, The Minnesota Festival Theater, Illusion Theater, and Dudley Riggs' Brave New Workshop.

Career 

While a theater major at the University of Arizona, Scott performed in summer stock in Garrison, Iowa. Later she studied at The Second City in Chicago and acted at the Brave New Workshop in Minneapolis. That led to opportunities in local theater and advertising.

Scott joined the cast of A Prairie Home Companion in 1992. Additionally, she played "Donna, the Makeup Lady" in the movie A Prairie Home Companion (released June 9, 2006), based on a screenplay by Keillor and filmed by Robert Altman at the Fitzgerald Theater in Saint Paul, Minnesota during the summer of 2005.

Discography 

 Sue Scott: Seriously Silly (A Prairie Home Companion) (2013), written by Garrison Keillor and featuring Garrison Keillor and Tom Keith

References

External links 

 
 

Living people
University of Arizona alumni
American radio actresses
20th-century American actresses
21st-century American actresses
1957 births